The 1956 German Grand Prix was a Formula One motor race held on 5 August 1956 at Nürburgring. It was race 7 of 8 in the 1956 World Championship of Drivers.

Winner
Forty-five-year-old Argentine Juan Manuel Fangio won the race for Ferrari, and broke Hermann Lang's 17-year-old lap record, set in a Mercedes.

Attendees
Present at the event was 18-year old Juan Carlos, later King of Spain, in support of his relative Alfonso de Portago.

Classification

Qualifying

Race

Notes
 – Includes 1 point for fastest lap

Shared drives
 Car #5: Alfonso de Portago (10 laps) and Peter Collins (4 laps).
 Car #4: Luigi Musso (8 laps) and Eugenio Castellotti (3 laps).

Championship standings after the race 
Drivers' Championship standings

Note: Only the top five positions are included.

References

German Grand Prix
German Grand Prix
German Grand Prix
German Grand Prix